Mortal Kombat Kard Game is an out-of-print collectible card game released in January 1996 by BradyGames in cooperation with Midway Games. It is based on the Mortal Kombat video game series but without excessive violence like its video game counterparts.

Game
The game featured all of the playable characters from the first two Mortal Kombat games (Mortal Kombat and Mortal Kombat II), as well as the hidden and boss characters. The game consisted of a set of 300 unique cards each with a rarity level of either bronze (common), silver (uncommon), or gold (rare). The cards were available in 60-card starter packs and 15-card booster packs.

Rules
Similar to the MK video games, the objective of the card game is to win the Mortal Kombat fighting tournament. Players must determine how many matches will make up a tournament, and the player who wins a majority of these matches wins the game. A player wins a match by defeating other Kombatants (players) two out of three rounds. One can win by having the most Kombat Points left when time runs out or by knocking the opponents down to zero Kombat Points. Any round that ends in a draw or with both Kombatants at zero Kombat Points (when both Kombatants are KO'd at the same time) must be replayed.

Reception
Allen Varney reviewed the game in The Duelist as a "worse clone" of Magic: the Gathering.

See also
Epic Battles, a collectible card game featuring Mortal Kombat: Deception characters.

References

External links
BradyGAMES Mortal Kombat Kard Game - Kard List
Mortal Kombat Kard Game | Board Game | BoardGameGeek

Card games introduced in 1995
Collectible card games
Works based on Mortal Kombat